Saudia Cargo is a Saudi Arabian airfreight flag carrier established in 2007 with headquarters in Jeddah, Kingdom of Saudi Arabia (KSA).

History
A subsidiary of Saudi Arabian Airlines (commonly known as Saudia), the company was established as part of a privatization in 2008. In 2008, the company joined the IATA interest group Cargo iQ. Saudia Cargo provides multi-specialized cargo handling as it operates a fleet of 8 freighter aircraft (B747-400 and B777F) to 13 cargo destinations as well as over 58 belly international destinations across six continents. The CEO is Omar Talal Hariri, a member of the Cargo Committee of the International Air Transport Association (IATA).
 
In September 2018, the company announced two new terminal projects for King Abdulaziz International Airport in Jeddah, and King Khaled International Airport in Riyadh scheduled to be completed in 2022. It has also expanded to Cairo and Dubai.

In 2019, Saudia Cargo sponsored the Saudi International Golf Tournament as the formal logistics partner.

Destinations

Fleet

Saudia Cargo has a fleet of B747-400/ERF, B747-400BDSF and B777F aircraft. They serve an international group of clients. As of December 2021, the Saudia Cargo fleet consists of the following aircraft:

References

External links

Saudia
Airlines of Saudi Arabia
Airlines established in 2007
Saudi Arabian brands
Saudi Arabian companies established in 2007